TWIC may refer to:

Transportation Worker Identification Credential
The Week in Chess